Oroperipatus peruvianus is a species of velvet worm in the Peripatidae family. Males of this species have 34 pairs of legs; females have 36 or 37. Female specimens range from 55 mm to 61 mm in length. The type locality is in Peru.

References

Onychophorans of tropical America
Onychophoran species
Animals described in 1917